Chinese Soviet or Soviet Chinese may refer to:
Chinese Soviet Republic
Sino-Soviet relations
Individual Chinese people in the Soviet Union, or the soviets which represented them there; see:
Dungan people
Chinese people in Soviet Russia
Languages of Chinese people in the Soviet Union
Dungan language
Latinxua Sin Wenz script, the Soviet-invented alphabet for writing Chinese

See also
Russian Chinese (disambiguation)
Communist Party of China